The 2018–19 Gaza Strip Premier League was the 2018–19 season of the Gaza Strip Premier League, the top football league in the Gaza Strip of Palestine. The season started on 8 September 2018 and ended on 10 March 2019.

Teams
A total of 12 teams competed in the league. Shabab Khan Yunis were the defending champions. Al-Qadisiya and Al-Ahli Gaza were relegated from last season, and were replaced by promoted teams Al-Ahli Beit Hanoun and Khidmat Khan Yunis.

Al-Ahli Beit Hanoun
Al-Hilal Gaza
Al-Ittihad Khan Yunis
Al-Ittihad Shuja'iyya
Al-Sadaqah
Gaza Sports Club
Khidmat Al-Shatia
Khidmat Khan Yunis
Khidmat Rafah
Shabab Jabalia
Shabab Khan Yunis
Shabab Rafah

League table

See also
2018–19 West Bank Premier League
2018–19 Palestine Cup

References

Gaza Strip Premier League seasons
1
Gaza Strip